Viktor Ivanovich Anpilov (2 October 1945, in Belaya Glina, Krasnodar Krai – 15 January 2018, in Moscow) was a Russian hardline communist politician and trade unionist.

Political activity 
Anpilov joined the Communist Party of the Soviet Union in 1972. He worked as a Soviet journalist in Latin America. Anpilov was very fluent in Spanish.

In 1990, Anpilov was nominated as candidate for the Congress of People's Deputies and Moscow city Soviet. As a candidate, he was reported to have maintained links with the ultranationalist Pamyat movement. After the dissolution of the USSR, Anpilov became the leader of the movement Labour Russia.

During the 1993 Russian constitutional crisis, he was one of the leaders of the anti-Boris Yeltsin uprising.

In 1999, his movement joined the coalition Stalin Bloc – For the USSR.

In 2007 he took part in the Dissenters March organized to protest against president Vladimir Putin's policies. Anpilov was a well-known figure and had a certain popularity; sometimes he was also invited as a guest on TV shows.

In the 2012 presidential election, he supported Vladimir Zhirinovsky's candidacy.

Personal 

Anpilov was fluent in Spanish and Portuguese and had worked in Latin America.

Death 
Anpilov died in 2018. He had been in a coma for the last three days of his life after a stroke.

Further reading
 Ostrovsky, Alexander (2014). Расстрел «Белого дома». Чёрный октябрь 1993 (The shooting of the "White House". Black October 1993) — М.: «Книжный мир», 2014. — 640 с. ISBN 978-5-8041-0637-0

References

External links 
 Labour Russia  site
Биография Виктора Ивановича Анпилова

1945 births
2018 deaths
People from Krasnodar Krai
Soviet journalists
Russian politicians
Russian communists
Anti-revisionists
Antisemitism in Russia
Neo-Stalinists
Defenders of the White House (1993)
Russian dissidents
Russian nationalists
Inmates of Lefortovo Prison
Moscow State University alumni
Communist Party of the Soviet Union members